FC Barcelona Voleibol also known as FCB Voleibol is a Spanish men's volleyball club from Barcelona and currently plays in the Spanish Superliga.

History
The club was founded in 1970,

Honours
Spanish Second Division: 2008
Catalan League (6): 1985, 1991, 1994, 2010, 2011, 2012
Copa Príncipe: 2008, 2020

Seasons results

Team
''Season 2016–17,

Notable players

References

External links
CVB Barça Voleibol Site 
Catalan Volleyball Federation 
Spanish Volleyball Federation 

Volleyball
Sports clubs in Barcelona
Catalan volleyball clubs
Volleyball clubs established in 1970
1970 establishments in Spain